Eucalyptus petrensis, commonly known as limestone mallee, straggly mallee or koodjat, is a species of straggly mallee that is endemic to Western Australia. It has mostly smooth bark, lance-shaped adult leaves, flower buds in groups of between seven and thirteen, creamy white flowers and more or less spherical fruit.

Description
It has smooth, light grey bark that is shed in strips, sometimes with rough bark at the base of the trunk. Flowering occurs from June to July or October and the flowers are creamy white.

The mallee has a similar appearance to Eucalyptus foecunda but E. petrensis has a more persistent style on the fruit.

Taxonomy and naming
Eucalyptus petrensis was first formally described by the botanists Ian Brooker and Stephen Hopper in 1993 in the journal Nuytsia. The type material was collected by Brooker near Seabird in 1988. The specific epithet (petrensis) is a Latin word meaning "found among rocks".

Distribution and habitat
Limestone mallee grows on thin, sandy soil on coastal limestone ridges, in shrubland dominated by Acacia species. It is restricted to coastal areas between Yalgorup National Park and Dongara.

Conservation status
This eucalypt is classified as "not threatened" in Western Australia by the Western Australian Government Department of Parks and Wildlife.

See also
List of Eucalyptus species

References

Eucalypts of Western Australia
petrensis
Myrtales of Australia
Plants described in 1993
Taxa named by Ian Brooker
Taxa named by Stephen Hopper